L. gracilis may refer to:
 Laosaurus gracilis, a dinosaur species from the late Cretaceous of Alberta
 Laxmannia gracilis, a tufted perennial herb species in the genus Laxmannia endemic to Australia
 Leiopython gracilis, a non-venomous snake species
 Leptoceratops gracilis, a primitive ceratopsian dinosaur species
 Leptodactylus gracilis, a frog species
 Leptolalax gracilis, a frog species found in Brunei, Indonesia, Malaysia and possibly Thailand
 Leptosomus gracilis, the Comoro Cuckoo-roller, a bird species
 Litsea gracilis, a plant species endemic to Malaysia

See also
 Gracilis (disambiguation)